Murusjøen is a lake in the municipality of Lierne in Trøndelag county, Norway.  The lake lies on the Norwegian side of the border with Sweden, just east of the lake Kvesjøen.

See also
List of lakes in Norway

References

Lierne
Lakes of Trøndelag